Tamara Walcott (born 1983/1984) is a powerlifter from the United States Virgin Islands. She started powerlifting in 2018. In August 2022, Guinness World Records credited her with setting a world record for lifting  during the three compound lifts (squat, bench press, and deadlift) at the 2022 World Raw Powerlifting Federation American Pro. She also set a world record for the heaviest elephant bar deadlift by a woman for lifting  during the Arnold Sports Festival in March 2022.

References

1980s births
Living people
United States Virgin Islands people
American powerlifters